Lieutenant General Lawrence Aboagye Okai (1934-2017) was a Ghanaian army officer. He was the Chief of the Defence Staff of the Ghana Armed Forces. He also served on the Supreme Military Council (SMC) of the government led by General Acheampong.

Army career 
Lawrence Okai volunteered for service in the Gold Coast Regiment of the Royal West African Frontier Force. He was selected to be trained as officer at the Royal Military Academy Sandhurst (RMAS), in the United Kingdom and was commissioned on 16 December 1955. In 1958, he became one of the original officers of the Ghana Regiment, when the Gold Coast gained its independence.

Okai served in the Ghana Army, and rose from 2nd Lieutenant to the rank of Major General.

General Okai was then chosen to be overall commander of the Armed Forces of Ghana, and was further promoted on appointment: he was Chief of the Defence Staff from December 1974 to November 1976.

Politics 
After the National Redemption Council took power, it formed a Supreme Military Council (SMC) to provide the executive government. The SMC was composed of the service chiefs and as the head of the armed forces, General Okai became a member of the military government. He served in the junta until he retired as Chief of the Defence Staff in November 1976, when he was succeeded in both roles by Lieutenant General Fred Akuffo.

Retirement 
In retirement, he became active in the Veterans Association of Ghana, and later served as the Chairman of its National Council.

He died in October 2017 and was buried, with military honours, in January 2018.

Sources 
 Ghana Armed Forces website
 Ghana Home Page

Living people
Ghanaian soldiers
1934 births